Paavo Edvard Kotila (26 August 1927 in Veteli – 26 January 2014) was a Finnish long-distance runner, Olympian, and three-time national champion in the marathon (1955, 1956, 1961).

Biography
Kotila won his second consecutive national title in 1956 with a time of 2:18:04.8. With this performance, he was ranked first in the marathon for 1956.

Kotila later finished 13th in the marathon on at the 1956 Summer Olympics and  won the 1960 Boston Marathon.

Notes

References

External links

1927 births
2014 deaths
People from Veteli
Finnish male long-distance runners
Athletes (track and field) at the 1956 Summer Olympics
Olympic athletes of Finland
Boston Marathon male winners
Sportspeople from Central Ostrobothnia